Sumner Sallade Bowman (February 9, 1867 – January 11, 1954) was an American professional baseball player in the early 1890s, who pitched for three teams during his two-year Major League Baseball career.  In  he played for the Philadelphia Phillies and later for the Pittsburgh Alleghenys, both of the National League.  In  he played for the Philadelphia Athletics of the American Association.  His career statistics include a win–loss record of 4–10, an earned run average of 5.22, anD 46 strikeouts in 146 innings pitched.  Bowman died in his hometown of Millersburg, Pennsylvania at the age of 86, and is interred at Oakhill Cemetery.

References

External links

1867 births
1954 deaths
Major League Baseball pitchers
Baseball players from Pennsylvania
Philadelphia Phillies players
Pittsburgh Alleghenys players
Philadelphia Athletics (AA 1891) players
19th-century baseball players
People from Dauphin County, Pennsylvania
Harrisburg Ponies players
Philadelphia Athletics (minor league) players